Dorodjatun Kuntjoro-Jakti (born 25 November 1939) was the Coordinating Minister for Economy and Finance in Indonesia in the Mutual Assistance Cabinet during the Megawati Sukarnoputri administration of 2001–2004.

Education

Faculty of Economics, University of Indonesia

University of California, Berkeley

Career
He was a lecturer in Faculty of Economics, University of Indonesia
And became the Dean of Faculty of Economics, University of Indonesia

Previously, Kuntjoro-Jakti was the ambassador of the Republic of Indonesia to the USA.

Kuntjoro-Jakti was born in Rangkasbitung, Banten.  He graduated with a PhD in political science from the University of California, Berkeley in 1980.

Research
Kuntjoro-Jakti has done many important research on the field of economics and has supervised numerous researches.

Economic View
Kuntjoro-Jakti believes in the power of invisible hands and very much support capitalistic economy.

References

Living people
Government ministers of Indonesia
Indonesian economists
Ambassadors of Indonesia to the United States
1939 births
University of California, Berkeley alumni